In the United Kingdom, some Commonwealth realms and Ireland, a medical royal college is a professional body in the form of a royal college responsible for the development of and training in one or more medical specialities.

United Kingdom and Ireland

Standards and guidance
They are generally charged with setting standards within their field and for supervising the training of doctors within that speciality, although the responsibility for the application of those standards in the UK, since 2010, rests with the General Medical Council.

In the United Kingdom and Ireland most medical royal colleges are members of the Academy of Medical Royal Colleges (AoMRC) are listed below, with their postgraduate faculties (some of which are independently members of the academy) and institutes. The Academy of Medical Royal Colleges itself has one faculty of its own – the Faculty of Medical Leadership and Management.

International role
The Royal Colleges are involved with international activities to improve health through education and training, with some of these efforts coordinated by the International Forum of the AoMRC. The Royal College of General Practitioners has been actively involved on an international level to help family medicine doctors have access to "contextually relevant training and development programmes".

History of institutions
Medical colleges can seek royal patronage and permission to use the prefix Royal, usually also having a royal charter.

The letters in brackets are commonly used for or by the institution, for example in post-nominal letters that denote membership or fellowship. Dates in brackets are the year of incorporation by Royal charter.  The origins of some of these institutions may predate their incorporation by many years, for example the origins of the Royal College of Surgeons of England may be traced directly to a Guild of Surgeons in the City of London in the fourteenth century.

Some institutions with similar functions are not listed here: they do not have a Royal Charter and are not members of the Academy of Medical Royal Colleges, for example the Irish Colleges of Anaesthetists, of General Practitioners, of Ophthalmologists and of Psychiatrists.

 Royal College of Anaesthetists
 Royal College of Emergency Medicine
 Royal College of General Practitioners
 Royal College of Obstetricians and Gynaecologists
 Royal College of Ophthalmologists
 Royal College of Paediatrics and Child Health
 Royal College of Pathologists
 Royal College of Physicians
 Royal College of Physicians and Surgeons of Glasgow
 Royal College of Physicians of Edinburgh
 Royal College of Physicians of Ireland
 Royal College of Psychiatrists
 Royal College of Radiologists
 Royal College of Surgeons in Ireland
 Royal College of Surgeons of Edinburgh
 Royal College of Surgeons of England

Canada 
 Royal College of Physicians and Surgeons of Canada

Australia and New Zealand 
 Royal Australasian College of Surgeons
 Royal Australasian College of Medical Administrators
 Royal Australasian College of Physicians
 Royal Australian and New Zealand College of Obstetricians and Gynaecologists
 Royal Australian and New Zealand College of Ophthalmologists
 Royal Australian and New Zealand College of Psychiatrists
 Royal Australian College of General Practitioners
 Royal College of Pathologists of Australasia
 Royal New Zealand College of General Practitioners

References